Chénéville is a town and municipality in the Outaouais region of Quebec, Canada, part of the Papineau Regional County Municipality.

History
First settled in the middle of the 19th century, its first post office opened in 1864 under the name Sévigné, perhaps in honour of the Marquise de Sévigné (1626-1696). From 1876 to 1884, the post office was known as Hartwell, and from 1884 on, it became Chénéville. It could be that it was renamed in memory of a nephew of Hercule Chéné who was born around 1864. (Pierre Hercule Chéné (1834-1904) was mayor of Ripon-et-Hartwell, Hartwell-et-Suffolk, Hartwell, and Hartwell-et-Preston, and counsellor of Chénéville.)

In 1903, the village separated from the United Township Municipality of Hartwell-et-Preston to form the Village Municipality of Chénéville, following a request from 55 citizens submitted to the Lieutenant Governor. Hygin Locas was its first mayor. At that time, the village consisted of 26 homes and 6 streets.

The Vinoy Post Office opened in 1871, most likely named in honour of the French General Joseph Vinoy (1800-1880). In 1920, the western portion of Suffolk Township separated and formed the Township Municipality of Suffolk-West, but was renamed Vinoy three years later. On August 21, 1996, the Vinoy merged to Chénéville and they formed the new Municipality of Chénéville.

Demographics

 Population total in 1996:
 Chénéville (village): 646
 Vinoy (municipality): 109
 Population in 1991:
 Chénéville (village): 635
 Vinoy (municipality): 125

Mother tongue:
 English as first language: 3.6%
 French as first language: 92.9%
 English and French as first language: 3.0%
 Other as first language: 0.6%

Education

A portion of the village lies in the Sir Wilfrid Laurier School Board, which operates Anglophone public schools:
 Laurentian Regional High School in Lachute

Notable people 

 Marquise Lepage (born 1959), producer, screenwriter, and film and television director

References

Incorporated places in Outaouais
Municipalities in Quebec